Auricularia cornea (毛木耳, maomuer or cloud ear) is a species of fungus in the order Auriculariales. It is commercially cultivated for food in China. The species was previously referred to Auricularia polytricha, but the latter species is probably a later synonym. Auricularia cornea is a popular ingredient in many Chinese dishes and is also used in traditional Chinese medicine.

Taxonomy
Auricularia cornea was originally described from Hawaii (Oahu) by German naturalist Christian Gottfried Ehrenberg in 1820. It was accepted as a distinct species by Bernard Lowy in his 1952 world monograph of Auricularia and subsequently confirmed as distinct by molecular research, based on cladistic analysis of DNA sequences.

Auricularia polytricha, originally described from India (Eastern Ghats) by French mycologist Camille Montagne in 1834, is a probable later synonym.

Vernacular names
The species is called in Mandarin , lit. "cloud ear", lit. "hairy wood ear"),  and in Japanese it is called ara-ge-ki-kurage (アラゲキクラゲ, lit. "rough-hair-tree-jellyfish"). It is one of several gelatinous fungi known as wood ear, wood fungus, ear fungus, or tree ear fungus, an allusion to their rubbery, ear-shaped fruitbodies. 

In Hawaii, it is known as pepeiao which means "ear"  In Southeast Asia, it is known as bok née in local English (from the Hokkien 木耳 bo̍k-ní) and is used in the salad kerabu bok nee. It is called jamur kuping in Indonesia and cendawan telinga kera in Malaysia, meaning "the ear mushroom" and "monkey's ear mushroom" respectively, and in the Philippines it is called tenga ng daga, meaning "rat's ear", due to its appearance. In Chinese cooking, it is often referred to as "Black Treasure". In New Zealand, it is known as hakeke by Māori.

The white, unpigmented form of A. cornea is called yumuer in China and is now cultivated.

Description
Fruit bodies solitary or clustered, ear-shaped, laterally attached to wood, sometimes by a very short stalk, elastic, gelatinous, pale brown to reddish brown, rarely white, up to 90 mm wide and 2 mm thick; upper surface densely hairy; under surface smooth. Under a microscope, the hairs on the upper surface are thick-walled, 180–425 × 6–9 μm. Basidia cylindrical, hyaline, three-septate, 60–75 × 4–6 μm. Spores hyaline, allantoid (sausage-shaped), 14–16.5 × 4.5–6 μm.

Habitat and distribution
Auricularia cornea grows on dead fallen or standing wood of broadleaf trees. The species is widely distributed in southern Asia, Africa, Australasia and the Pacific, and South America.

Uses
Auricularia cornea is usually sold in dried form, and needs to be soaked in water before use. While almost tasteless, it is prized for its slippery but slightly crunchy texture, and its potential nutritional benefits. The slight crunchiness persists despite most cooking processes. Auricularia cornea is coarser than Auricularia heimuer, and is more likely to be used in soups rather than stir-fries.

Māori traditionally cooked wood ear fungus by steaming in an earth oven and eating with sow thistle and potatoes. From the 1870s to the 1950s, the fungus was collected and exported from New Zealand to China. 

According to Chinese medicine practitioners, eating dried and cooked wood ear can have health benefits for people with high blood pressure or cancer, and can prevent coronary heart disease and arteriosclerosis. 

This fungus is used in Cantonese desserts.

A cup of dry cloud ear fungus contains 19.6 grams of dietary fibre.

See also

References

External links
 Black Fungus
 Chinese Cuisine - Cloud Ears and Wood Ears

Auriculariales
Chinese edible mushrooms
Edible fungi
Fungi in cultivation
Buddhist cuisine
Fungi of Asia
Fungi of Australia
Fungi of New Zealand
Fungi described in 1820
Fungi of Africa
Fungi of South America
Taxa named by Christian Gottfried Ehrenberg